The North County Cobras are a minor league semi-professional football team based out of Vista, California. They are currently members of the Southern Division of the Western Conference in the LCFL. In 2009, the Cobras won the Western Conference Championship and the National LCFL Championship.

About
The team has played 5 seasons with the LCFL. They are the football team for north San Diego County, hence the name North County Cobras. They advertise with Oceanside Magazine and Today's Local News. The 2010 season partners the team with the North County Times and have secured a deal with KOCT to broadcast home games on Tuesday and Thursdays during prime time at 6p.m. Founded by Tony Vinson team owner who is also the head coach, co-owner Terrence Webster.

Team Uniform
The uniform of the North County Cobras are copper, black and white. They have two team logos, one of a cobra with the team name and one with the team's football helmet.

Season-By-Season 

|-
| colspan="6" align="center" | North County Cobras (LCFL)
|-
|2009 || 12 || 1 || 0 || 1st LCFL WEST - South Division/ LCFL West Champion / LCFL National Champion ||
|-
!Totals || 12 || 1 || 0
|colspan="2"| (including only LCFL)

External links
 North County Cobras Official Web Site
 LCFL Web-Site

American football teams in San Diego
American football teams in California